Maurice Desfassiaux (1886–1956) was a French cinematographer.

Selected filmography
 The Three Musketeers (1921)
 The Crazy Ray (1925)
 Carmen (1926)
 The Porter from Maxim's (1927)
 The Italian Straw Hat (1928)
 Cagliostro (1929)
 My Aunt from Honfleur (1931)
 The Three Musketeers (1932)
 Moonlight (1932)
 Miquette (1934)

References

Bibliography
 Powrie, Phil & Rebillard, Éric. Pierre Batcheff and stardom in 1920s French cinema. Edinburgh University Press, 2009.

External links

1886 births
1956 deaths
Cinematographers from Paris